The 2015–16 Northern Colorado Bears women's basketball team represented the University of Northern Colorado during the 2015–16 NCAA Division I women's basketball season. The Bears are led by second year head coach Kamie Ethridge and played their home games at the Bank of Colorado Arena. They were a member of the Big Sky Conference. They finished the season 13–16, 8–10 in Big Sky play to finish in a tie for eighth place. They lost in the first round of the Big Sky women's tournament to Idaho State.

Roster

Schedule

|-
!colspan=9 style="background:#000066; color:#FFCC33;"| Exhibition

|-
!colspan=9 style="background:#000066; color:#FFCC33;"| Non-conference regular season

|-
!colspan=9 style="background:#000066; color:#FFCC33;"| Big Sky regular season

|-
!colspan=9 style="background:#000066; color:#FFCC33;"| Big Sky Women's Tournament

See also
2015–16 Northern Colorado Bears men's basketball team

References

Northern Colorado
Northern Colorado Bears women's basketball seasons
Northern Colorado Bears women's basketball
Northern Colorado Bears women's basketball